Ornes or Urnes is a village in Luster Municipality in Vestland county, Norway. The village is located on a small peninsula that juts out into the Lustrafjorden, the innermost part of the Sognefjorden. The village sits on the east side of the fjord, directly across the fjord from the village of Solvorn. Ornes is notable because it is the site of the 12th century Urnes Stave Church.

There has been a regular ferry route from Ornes to Solvorn, across the fjord, since 1859.

Media gallery

Name
The Old Norse form of the name was Órnes. The first element is the preposition ór 'out, outstanding' - the last element is nes 'headland, naze'. The common (but wrong) form Urnes is from the time of Danish rule ("Wrnes" 1563, "Vrnes" 1666, etc.).

References

Villages in Vestland
Luster, Norway